Consumer Revolt is the debut studio album by American noise rock group Cop Shoot Cop, released in 1990 by Circuit Records.

Track listing

Personnel
Adapted from the Consumer Revolt liner notes.

Cop Shoot Cop
Tod Ashley – lead vocals, high-end bass guitar
Jim Coleman – sampler
Jack Natz – low-end bass guitar, lead vocals (13)
David Ouimet – sampler
Phil Puleo – drums, percussion

Production and additional personnel
 Steve Ankler – lead vocals (11)
 Martin Bisi – production, mixing
 Cop Shoot Cop – production
 Subvert Entertainment – cover art, design
 Wharton Tiers – recording (5, 8), mixing (5, 8)

Release history

References

External links 
 

1990 debut albums
Cop Shoot Cop albums
Big Cat Records albums
Albums produced by Martin Bisi